William Penn is a bronze statue by Alexander Milne Calder of William Penn, the founder and namesake for the Commonwealth of Pennsylvania.

It is located atop the Philadelphia City Hall in Philadelphia, Pennsylvania. It was installed in 1894. It was cast in fourteen sections, and took almost two years to finish.

For almost 90 years, an unwritten gentlemen's agreement forbade any building in the city from rising above the hat on the Penn statue. This agreement ended in 1985, when final approval was given to the Liberty Place complex. Its centerpieces are two skyscrapers, One Liberty Place and Two Liberty Place, which rose well above the height of Penn's hat. 

Since 2019, there have been calls to remove statues in the city which are now considered politically volatile. Due to William Penn being a slave owner, columnist Stu Bykofsky for The Philadelphia Inquirer sardonically wrote: "We can't abide 37 feet of him towering over the city. Take down the statue and snip his name off the commonwealth. We will become Sylvania."

Gallery

See also
 Curse of Billy Penn
 List of public art in Philadelphia

References

External links
William Penn at Philadelphia Public Art

Outdoor sculptures in Philadelphia
1894 sculptures
Bronze sculptures in Pennsylvania
Statues in Pennsylvania
1894 establishments in Pennsylvania
Sculptures of men in Pennsylvania
Monuments and memorials in Pennsylvania
Sculptures by Alexander Milne Calder
William Penn